Jamii Bora, which means "good families" in Swahili, is a Nairobi, Kenya based microfinance organization. , it was the largest microfinance institution in Kenya. It was started by Ingrid Munro in 1999.

External links
 Official Web site of Jamii Bora
 Official Web site of Jamii Bora in Sweden

References

Non-profit organisations based in Kenya
1999 establishments in Kenya
Organisations based in Nairobi
Organizations established in 1999